Lady Baltimore is a non-releasable bald eagle in the care of the non-profit Juneau Raptor Center (JRC), in Juneau, Alaska. Lady Baltimore was found shot and injured on Alaska's Douglas Island in 2006. She had suffered injuries to her beak and one wing caused by a poacher. The injury to her beak caused the retina in her left eye to become detached, blinding her in that eye. Because of these injuries she has no depth perception, and cannot be released into the wild.

Life

Lady Baltimore was found after a failed poaching, which left her alive but severely injured. Volunteers with the Juneau Raptor Center rescued her, after an estimated 2 weeks of surviving her injuries on her own. JRC volunteers found her to be malnourished, and determined that she could not survive on her own, because her injuries caused her to aim her body poorly when flying and hunting. Since then, Lady Baltimore has been cared for year-round by JRC. During the summer tourist season she is put on display as an educational animal in a mew created and maintained by JRC, at the Mount Roberts Tramway on Mount Roberts.

New habitat, and relocation
In 2019, the Mount Roberts Tramway and other donors paid for a new mew. The new habitat is larger, and provides better viewing for both visitors as well as the eagle.

However, in 2022, Lady Baltimore's host, the Juneau Raptor Center, ended operations. As a result, Lady Baltimore will be moved along with two other eagles to the Alaska Raptor Center in Sitka.

References

2006 in Alaska
2022 in Alaska
Individual eagles
Juneau, Alaska
Individual animals in the United States